Moscow Art Theatre School is the studio school of the Moscow Art Theatre. It is a state educational institution that has existed since 1943. The initiator of the studio school was Vladimir Nemirovich-Danchenko.

Open three faculties —  the cast (training —  4 years, the competition —  30 per place), staging (training —  5 years, the contest —  3 persons per place) and Producer (training —  5 years, the competition — 4 persons per place). Form of study —  full-time.

History 

The idea of the studio-school was expressed for the first time at the meeting of the leaders of Moscow Art Theater on March 21, 1943. It was the last will of the director and pedagogue Vladimir Nemirovich-Danchenko, who died of a heart attack a month later, April 25, 1943. The following day (April 26, 1943), a special resolution of the Council of People's Commissioners of the RSFS of Russia was published immediately, which contained a clause relating to the creation of the studio school.

The studio-school was officially inaugurated on October 20, 1943. The first rector was the theater director and critic Vassili Grigorievich Sakhnovski. The first class consisted of 27 students graduating in 1947.

In the 1940s there was just one faculty for drama theater and cinema actors. In 1987 new branch for theater painters was opened under the direction of Valeri Yakovlevich Levental. In 1989, new department for artist-technologists for stage costume was opened under the direction of the People's Artist of Russia Eleonora Petrovna Maklakova. The Department for lighting artists was opened in 1988.

In 1991 a department of theater management was established in the theatre school. In 2005 the department was transformed into a producer faculty.

Rectors 
(in chronological order)
 Vasily Sahnovsky (1943–1945)
 Veniamin Radomyslensky (1945–1980)
 Nikolai Alekseev (1980–1983)
 Vadim Krupitsky (1984–1986)
 Oleg Tabakov (1986–2000)
 Anatoly Smelyansky (2000–2013)
 Igor Zolotovitsky (2013–present)

References

External links
 Сайт школы-студии МХАТ
 Школа-студия МХАТ на сайте ЦМПК

 
Educational institutions established in 1943
1943 establishments in Russia
Drama schools in Russia
Cultural heritage monuments of regional significance in Moscow